The Football Federation of the 6th Department Caazapá (Federación de Fútbol Sexto Departamento Caazapá) is the departamental governing body of football (soccer) in the department of Caazapá, in Paraguay. The federation is responsible for the organization of football leagues in the different cities of the department and it is also the regulator of the clubs. The main office of this federation is located in the city of Caazapá.

Tournaments for each league of this federation are played every year to determine the best teams. Afterwards, the champions of each league face each other to determine the best team in the department, with the overall winner being promoted to a higher division in the Paraguayan football league system.

Leagues in Caazapá

Liga Abaiense de Fútbol
The Liga Abaiense de Fútbol is based in the city of Abaí. The following teams are part of this league:

 16 de Agosto
 Atletico San Sebastian
 29 de Setiembre
 Union Santa Elena
 Atletico San Miguel
 15 de Mayo
 15 de Agosto
 12 de Junio
 6 de Enero
 1 de Mayo

Liga Buenavisteña de Fútbol
The Liga Buenavisteña de Fútbol is based in the city of Buenavista. The following teams are part of this league:
 Olimpia
 Sportivo Central
 Cerro Porteño
 Sportivo Juventud
 Atletico Asuncion
 Acosta Nu
 Guarani

Liga Caazapeña de Fútbol
The Liga Caazapeña de Fútbol is based in the city of Caazapá. The following teams are part of this league:
 25 de Enero
 Teniente Dionicio Fariña
 Fray Luis de Bolaños
 Juventud
 Nanawa
 Sportivo Agricola
 Guarani
 25 de Abril
 16 de Agosto
 1 de Enero
 27 de Setiembre

Liga Deportiva Gral. H. Morínigo
The Liga Deportiva Gral. H. Morínigo is based in the city of Gral. H. Morínigo. The following teams are part of this league:
 25 de Abril
 Sportivo Santa Maria
 12 de Octubre
 Sportivo San Estanislao
 Cerro Porteño
 Atletico 1 de Mayo
 Ferroviario
 14 de Mayo
 20 de Julio FBC
 1 de Marzo

Liga de Fútbol Gobernador Rivera
The Liga de Fútbol Gobernador Rivera is based in the city of San Juan Neponuceno. The following teams are part of this league:
 16 de Mayo
 Sportivo San Carlos
 Sportivo 4 de Noviembre
 25 de Enero
 Atletico Juventud
 13 de Junio
 Sportivo San Juan
 Atletico Independiente
 Atletico 3 de Febrero
 30 de Agosto

Liga Yegreña de Fútbol
The Liga Yegreña de Fútbol is based in the city of Fulgencio Yegros. The following teams are part of this league:
 14 de Mayo FBC
 Sportivo Soseno
 Sportivo San Rafael
 Independiente
 Humaita FBC
 Union Club SD
 Helvecia FBC
 Sportivo Obrero

Liga Yuteña de Fútbol
The Liga Yuteña de Fútbol is based in the city of Yuty. The following teams are part of this league:
 30 de Agosto
 6 de Enero
 Mcal. Jose Felix Estigarribia
 Cerro Porteño
 Sol de Mayo
 Sportivo Juvenil
 4 de Diciembre
 Sportivo Navideño
 Capitan Brizuela Aldana
 Atletico 17 de Junio
 24 de Junio FBC
 Coronel Martinez
 Atletico Capitan Benitez
 Deportivo Juventud
 Libertad
 Deportivo Obrero

External links
 UFI Website

Caazapa
Caazapá Department